Ho-jung, also spelled Ho-jeong, is a Korean unisex given name. The meaning differs based on the hanja used to write each syllable of the name. There are 49 hanja with the reading "ho" and 75 hanja with the reading "jung" on the South Korean government's official list of hanja which may be used in given names. 

People with this name include:
Kim Ho-jung (born 1968), South Korean actress
Yoo Ho-jeong (born 1969), South Korean actress
Lee Ho-jung (figure skater) (born 1997), South Korean female figure skater
Jeong Ho-jeong (born 1988), South Korean male football defender 
Choi Ho-jung (born 1989), South Korean male football player

See also
List of Korean given names

References

Korean unisex given names